The RER station Saint-Gratien is a railway station in the commune of Saint-Gratien, Val-d’Oise department, France.

The station 

The station was built by the Nord company in 1906 and opened in 1908 when the extension to St. Gratien and Ermont was placed in service.

The station is served by trains on Branch C1 of the RER C.

References

Réseau Express Régional stations
Railway stations in France opened in 1908